Lemont may refer to:

 Lemont, Illinois
 Lemont, Pennsylvania
 Lemont, Tasmania